Sosnowiec is an industrial city county in the Dąbrowa Basin of southern Poland, in the Silesian Voivodeship, which is also part of the Silesian Metropolis municipal association. Located in the eastern part of the Upper Silesian Industrial Region, Sosnowiec is one of the cities of the Katowice urban area, which is a conurbation with the overall population of 2.7 million people; as well as the greater Upper Silesian metropolitan area populated by about 5.3 million people. The population of the city is 194,818 as of December 2021.

Geography

It is believed that the name Sosnowiec originates from the Polish word sosna, referring to the pine forests growing in the area prior to 1830. The village was originally known as Sosnowice. Other variations of the name include Sosnowietz, Sosnowitz, Sosnovitz (Yiddish), Sosnovyts, Sosnowyts, Sosnovytz, Sosnowytz, and Sosnovetz. There are five other smaller settlements in Poland also called Sosnowiec, located in the Kielce Voivodship, Łódź Voivodship, and Opole Voivodship.

Sosnowiec serves as one of the administrative centres of the geographical and historical area of southern Poland known as the Zagłębie Dąbrowskie (the Dąbrowa Basin). It lies within the historic Lesser Poland region near the border with Silesia. The full list of rivers includes Biała Przemsza as well as Czarna Przemsza, Brynica, Bobrek, and Potok Zagórski creek. The city is part of the Silesian Voivodeship since its formation in 1999. Previously (since 1945), it was part of Katowice Voivodeship, and before World War II, Sosnowiec belonged to Kielce Voivodeship.

History

The history of the city begins in 1902 when it was granted city rights after the merger a number of older settlements. However, the history of the village of Sosnowiec dates back to the year 1227, when it was mentioned for the first time. It was a small settlement in the Polish Duchy of Kraków, located in close vicinity of much larger and better-developed villages of Sielce and Zagórze (both are now districts of the city). Other districts are even older. Milowice was first mentioned in 1123 as Miley. Documents from 1228 already mention Milowice, Klimontów, and Zagórze. Furthermore, Milowice was placed on a 1561 map.

As part of the Polish–Lithuanian Commonwealth, Sosnowiec belonged to Kraków Voivodeship in the larger Lesser Poland Province of the Polish Crown. It became a border town after the neighbouring Duchies of Silesia passed to the Bohemian Crown in 1335. In the result of the third partition of Poland in 1795, however, it was seized by the Kingdom of Prussia and was included into the newly established province of New Silesia. During the Napoleonic Wars, it became part of the Duchy of Warsaw in 1807 and later, of Congress Poland ruled by the namiestniks of the Russian Empire. Located at the borders with the German Empire and Austria-Hungary, Sosnowiec became famous for the Three Emperors' Corner tripoint, which was located within current limits of the city. During the January Uprising, in February 1863, the Battle of Sosnowiec was fought, in which Polish insurgents led by  defeated the Russians. The victory allowed the Poles to take control of the surrounding towns as well.

City rights

Obtaining the city rights helped the economic and cultural development of the town. Apart from steelworks and coal-mines and many enterprises of heavy and light industry, new cultural and social establishments were opened as well. The newly established town consisted of the districts of Sosnowiec, Pogoń, Ostra Górka, Sielec, Kuźnica and Radocha, all of which had been separate villages before. The very fact that Russian authorities waited for so long to grant Sosnowiec town rights is seen as a punishment for local support for the Polish January Uprising 1863/64, after which numerous towns had seen their status, and were reduced to a village status. Sosnowiec was the first post-1860s location in Congress Poland to have received town charter, the second being Puławy in 1906.
 

Natural resources and a good geographical location had an important influence on the development of Sosnowiec. The opening of a branch line of the Warsaw-Vienna Railway in 1859 was vitally important for the growth of the town. Development of industry with the new factory of rope and wire, rolling mill, steelworks, iron foundry, steam boilers factory, and later spinning mill, dye-house and paper mill sealed the new image of the town as entirely urban. The Summer Theatre and, in 1887, the Winter Theatre were founded, the second of which was called City Theatre from 1924 in independent Poland, and later the Theatre of Zagłębie. In 1914, the village of Środula was incorporated into Sosnowiec.

Poland finally regained independence in 1918, after World War I. In the Second Polish Republic, Sosnowiec became part of the Kielce Voivodeship, and in 1934 the City County of Sosnowiec was established. Sosnowiec suffered war damages during both major military conflicts in the 20th century: World War I, which caused mainly destruction to industry, and World War II, which brought about the terror of executions.

World War II

After the 1939 Invasion of Poland, which started World War II, the city was occupied by Nazi Germany and renamed Sosnowitz. On September 4, 1939, German troops murdered 10 Poles, including 15-year-old boy Henryk Słomka, in Sosnowiec in revenge for Polish defense. Around the same time, the Germans murdered nine Poles in nearby Klimontów (present-day district of Sosnowiec). The Einsatzgruppe zbV entered the city on September 12, 1939. The German police carried out mass searches of Polish houses. Initially under military administration set up as part of the General Government, Sosnowiec was annexed by Germany and incorporated into the Province of Silesia on 20 November 1939. In March 1940, the Germans established a transit camp (Gefangenensammellager) for arrested Poles in Sosnowiec. Inhabitants of Sosnowiec were also among Poles murdered in Celiny in June 1940. The Germans operated three labour subcamps of the Stalag VIII-B/344 prisoner-of-war camp in the city, and two more in the present-day district of Klimontów. The Polish underground resistance movement was active in the city.

In June 1943 thousands of Jews were deported from Sosnowiec Ghetto to the Auschwitz concentration camp. The ghetto was liquidated two months later and almost all remaining Jews (around 15,000) were also deported to Auschwitz. Previously there had been considerable underground activity among them. The Germans established and operated two subcamps of the Auschwitz concentration camp in the city. In the first subcamp they held about 100 Polish forced labourers, and in the second, larger, they held hundreds of forced labourers, initially mostly Jews. In 1944, the Germans sent kidnapped Polish children from Sosnowiec to the Potulice concentration camp.

The Vistula–Oder Offensive of the Red Army in January 1945 brought about the liberation of the city.

Post-war

After World War II, Sosnowiec further developed. On June 1, 1975, the metropolitan area was expanded when the neighbouring locations of Zagórze, Kazimierz Górniczy, Porąbka, Klimontów, and Maczki, became its districts. By 1977 the population of the city reached 200,000. Further growth was accelerated by the construction of Katowice Steelworks, and in 1981, the population of Sosnowiec was 250,000, reaching its peak in 1987, when it was 259,000. Since then, the population has been declining. In 1992, the city became the seat of the Roman Catholic Diocese of Sosnowiec.

Economy

Sosnowiec is characterised by its urban dynamics, economic activity, cultural heritage, and natural environment. In recent years, Sosnowiec was further developed from an industrial centre (with mainly mining and heavy industries) into a hub of trade and services.  Nevertheless, it still operates several important coal mines, steel factories and other industrial plants. Its Special Economic Zone, established in Sosnowiec thanks to the efforts of local authorities, plays a major role in attracting new businesses into the area. As a result, several companies with Polish and foreign capital opened their businesses in the city.  Sosnowiec City Office was awarded the ISO 9001 2001 quality certificate for its management system for providing services for the local community.

From 2006, a new trade centre Expo Silesia began hosting numerous trade shows. Activities of Artistic and Literary Society of Zagłębie Dąbrowskie prove also that Sosnowiec as an industrial centre is not only a working-class environment.

Districts

For Sosnowiec's 100th birthday, the downtown area was thoroughly rebuilt, to harmonise its architectural layout and give the city a more modern image. In 2004 Sosnowiec authorities and designers were awarded the Grand Prix for the rebuilding of the downtown area in a competition for the best public space in the Śląskie Provinces. This investment had been accompanied by a program designed to improve the esthetic qualities of the city, under which a comprehensive program for unifying the colors of the elevations, and advertisements entitled “rainbow city” were introduced. Among the city districts there are:

Dańdówka
Dębowa Góra
Jęzor
Juliusz
Kazimierz Górniczy
Klimontów
Maczki
Milowice
Modrzejów
Niwka
Ostra Górka
Ostrowy Górnicze
Pogoń district in Sosnowiec
Porąbka
Radocha
Rudna district of Sosnowiec
Sielec
Stary Sosnowiec
Środula
Sosnowiec Śródmieście 
Zagórze

Points of interest

There are many relics of the industrial era, especially residences of industrialists. Most of them are located outside the strict city center, on the Czarna Przemsza river bank. One of the oldest is a 17th-century castle known as the Sielecki Castle. Other main tourist attractions include:

 The Dietel Palace
 Schöen Palace and museum
 Oskar Schöen's Palace called also New Schöen Palace
 Wilhelm Palace
 Cathedral Basilica of the Assumption of the Blessed Virgin Mary
 Orthodox Church of the Holy Virgin, Hope, Luby and their mother Zofia
 St. John Evangelical Church
 St Thomas Church
 Railway Station Sosnowiec Główny
 Railway Station Sosnowiec Maczki
 Huta Buczek
 Old Jewish cemetery
 Three Emperors' Corner

Parks and gardens
Sosnowiec has more than 2,250 ha of green areas occurring as parks, squares, protection zones, lot gardens and forests. In the area of the city preserved many parks established at the residence of industrialists, and also created a lot of new. Many of them present historical and natural value. Main parks and green areas include the Sielecki Park, which is a historical park at the castle with many natural monuments; the historical Dietel Park; the Park-Palace Complex of Schöen with two palaces; the Millennium Park, the Środula Park with a sports complex; the nature park "Szopienice-Borki"; as well as the peat bog "Bory" protected area, part of Natura 2000.

Education and science

Institutions of higher learning in Sosnowiec include:
 The University of Silesia in Katowice (schools of modern languages, natural science, technology and a language teacher training college)
 Faculty of Earth Science
 Faculty of Computer and Materials Science
 Faculty of Philology
 The Medical University of Silesia in Katowice,
 Faculty of Pharmacy
 The private School of Marketing and Management
 The Silesian University of Technology
 Faculty of Automatic Control, Electronics and Computer Science
 The private School of Ecology

Among general secondary level schools in Sosnowiec there are high-schools such as the II Liceum Ogólnokształcące im. Emilii Plater, III Liceum Ogólnokształcące im. Bolesława Prusa, and IV Liceum Ogólnokształcące im. Stanisława Staszica.

Sports
 Zagłębie Sosnowiec – men's football team, four times Polish Cup winner
 KH Zagłębie Sosnowiec – ice hockey team, which competes in the Polska Hokej Liga (top division), five times Polish champions
 Płomień Sosnowiec – men's volleyball team playing in Polish Volleyball League (top division), phoenix club of Płomień Milowice, in total 3 times Polish champions and winners of the 1977–78 CEV Champions League
 Czarni Sosnowiec – most accomplished Polish women's football club, 12 times Polish champions, playing in the Ekstraliga (top division)

Notable people
Ignaz von Szyszylowicz (1857–1910), Polish botanist
Shlomo Chanoch Rabinowicz (1882–1942), fourth and last Rebbe of the Radomsk Hasidic dynasty
Jacek Mierzejewski (1883–1925), Polish painter
Shlomo Sztencl (1884–1919), Polish Orthodox Jewish rabbi
Władysław Szafer (1886–1970), Polish botanist and palaeobotanist
Zbigniew Babiński (1896–1940), Polish military and sports aviator
Shlomo Zev Zweigenhaft (1915–2005), Orthodox Jewish Rabbi
Jan Kiepura (1902–1966), Polish singer and actor
Paul Godwin (1902–1982), Polish-German violinist
Jędrzej Giertych (1903–1992), Polish politician
Władysław Spiegelman (1906–1982), father of Art Spiegelman
Yehiel Feiner (1909–2001), the widely translated writer of Holocaust novels known by his pseudonym Ka-Tzetnik
Władysław Szpilman (1911–2000), Polish pianist and classical composer, widely known as the central figure in the 2002 Roman Polanski film The Pianist
Edward Gierek (1913–2001), Polish communist politician; first secretary of the ruling Polish United Workers' Party (PZPR) 
Haim Hefer (1925–2012), Israeli poet and songwriter
Stanisław Jaros (1932–1963), Polish anti-communist activist
Krystyna Czajkowska (born 1936), Polish volleyball player
James Spigelman (born 1946), Australian judge who served as Chief Justice of New South Wales from 1998 to 2011
Jacek Majchrowski (born 1947), Polish politician and historian, Mayor of Kraków
Magdalena Piekorz (born 1974), Polish film director and screenwriter
Piotr Łukasiewicz (born 1974) is a Polish diplomat
Łukasz Simlat (born 1977), Polish actor
Joanna Krupa (born 1979), Polish-American model, actress and animal rights activist
Marcin Drzymont (born 1981), Polish footballer
Marcin Koniusz (born 1983), Polish sabre fencer
Eugen Polanski (born 1986), Polish footballer
Paula Kania (born 1992), Polish tennis player

Twin towns – sister cities

Sosnowiec is twinned with:

 Derhachi, Ukraine
 Dziwnów, Poland
 Idar-Oberstein, Germany
 Komárom, Hungary
 Maârif (Casablanca), Morocco
 Les Mureaux, France
 Roubaix, France
 Suceava, Romania

Notelist

References

External links

Official web site of Sosnowiec
Sosnowiec on an old photography (in Polish)
Local weather in Sosnowiec, Weather.com
Mapquest link to 6 towns in Poland called Sosnowiec
Encarta map of Sosnowiec, Śląskie, Poland
Pictures of Sosnowiec (in Polish)
 Jewish Community in Sosnowiec on Virtual Shtetl
Yizkor book of Sosnowiec
 Note about Haim Hefer (1925–2012) (in Hebrew)
 

 
City counties of Poland
Cities and towns in Silesian Voivodeship
Kraków Voivodeship (14th century – 1795)
Kielce Voivodeship (1919–1939)
Holocaust locations in Poland
Nazi war crimes in Poland